The Meridian Civil Rights Trail is a heritage trail in Meridian, Mississippi in the United States. It was created in 2014 by the Meridian and Lauderdale County Tourism Bureau in consultation with a committee of local residents to highlight the history of civil rights activism in the area.

Tour stops
The first seven markers are within walking distance of each other.  The remaining eleven markers require a vehicle to visit within a reasonable amount of time. All Locations are in Meridian, Mississippi.

See also
United States Civil Rights Trail

References

External links
Meridian/Lauderdale County Tourism Bureau

Civil rights movement
Meridian, Mississippi
Buildings and structures in Meridian, Mississippi
Mississippi Landmarks
Tourist attractions in Mississippi
2014 establishments in Mississippi
Heritage trails